Myo Win (born 13 November 1952) is a Burmese dental professor who served as Rector of the University of Dental Medicine, Yangon from 2008 to 2012. He is the coordinator of the first private orthodontic training program in Myanmar.

Early life and education
Myo Win was born in Yangon, Myanmar on 13 November 1952. He graduated from University of Dental Medicine, Yangon in July, 1972. He received M.Sc and M.Phil from London in 1990.

References

Burmese dental professors
1948 births
Living people